Stupid Lake is a freshwater lake in Manitoba, Canada. The lake is located near the Hayes River. It has an elevation of 151 metres (495 ft) above sea level. The closest settlement is Shamattawa, at 88 kilometres (55 mi) away. It was named by John Norquay on November 7, 1879.

See also 
 List of lakes in Canada

References 

Lakes of Manitoba